Stewart Lee's Comedy Vehicle is a British comedy series created by and starring Stewart Lee and broadcast on BBC Two. It features stand-up comedy and sketches united by a theme for each episode. It was script-edited by Chris Morris and was initially executive-produced by Armando Iannucci, marking a rare reformation of a creative team formed for On the Hour in 1991. Lee had said that this is exactly the sort of show he wanted to do, saying "I don't want to do any television that I don't have complete control of."

The first series aired in 2009, with subsequent series in 2011, 2014 and 2016. Stewart Lee announced in May 2016 that the BBC had declined to make any further series. This was due primarily to cuts to BBC 2's comedy budget which would now focus instead solely on scripted comedy.

Format

The main body of the show is a Stewart Lee stand-up comedy performance, recorded live at the Mildmay Club in Stoke Newington with a club audience. Usually two episodes of the show were recorded per evening.  Each episode has a theme, around which Lee performs his material.

The stand-up is punctuated with sketches, written by Lee but more usually performed by Kevin Eldon and Paul Putner with cameos from other TV and circuit comedians. From series 2, the sketches were removed in favour of a single short film at the end of each episode.

A recurring element of the programme is the "hostile interrogator", played by Armando Iannucci in the second series and by Chris Morris in Series 3 and 4. In a darkened room, the interrogator quizzes Lee about his approach to stand-up comedy and his attitudes toward his audience and the comedy industry. In Series 1, the interrogator segments (with Iannucci and Johnny Vegas as interrogators) were not included in the main programme, accessed instead via the BBC Red Button and included on the DVD releases as bonus features. The interrogator segments were integrated into the main body of the show by Series 2.

The opening theme tune to Series 1 is "Tom Hark" by Elias & His Zig-Zag Jive Flutes. Series 2 onwards have a cold open and no theme tune or title card.

DVD releases

Season 1 was released on 7 September 2009 as a 2-disc region-2 PAL set.  Red-button extras are included.

Season 2 was released on 20 June 2011 as a single-disc region-2 PAL issue.  Red-button extras are absent.

Season 3 was released on 10 November 2014 as a 2-disc region-2 PAL set. During a promotional run of his A Room With A Stew tour at the Leicester Square Theatre the admission price included a complimentary copy of the DVD.

Season 4 was released on 10 October 2016 as a 2-disc region-2 PAL set.

Episodes

Series 1
Series 1 was broadcast on BBC Two between 16 March to 20 April 2009.

Series 2
Series 2 was filmed between 11 and 14 January 2011; aired from 4 May to 8 June 2011. It features Armando Iannucci as the hostile interrogator. Six lines in the series were written by Bridget Christie, Simon Munnery and Tim Richardson.

Series 3
Series 3 was filmed between 17 and 19 December 2013; and aired from 1 March 2014. It introduced Chris Morris as the hostile interrogator.

Series 4
Series 4 consists of six episodes, broadcast from 3 March 2016 onwards.

Reception
Andrew Billen of The Times described the first series as "the most intelligent half hour of stand-up you will see on television this year" and that Lee "has become the master of deadpan stand-up". The Guardian Guide said "Lee's Vehicle feels well overdue, with his brand of bone-dry, spot-on scepticism a refreshing change from the perky, ambitious tones of the Mock the Week brigade [...] it's brilliant." Brian Viner of The Independent said "In my front room, Lee was preaching not so much to the converted, as to an ayatollah. He did so brilliantly, though."

The Guardian named Comedy Vehicle as one of its top ten television highlights of 2009, commenting that it "was the kind of TV that makes you feel like you're not the only one wondering how we came to be surrounded by so much unquestioned mediocrity". One of the show's few negative reviews came in the Sunday Mercury, which stated: "His whole tone is one of complete, smug condescension". Lee subsequently used this line to advertise his next stand-up tour.

Writing about the third series in The Metro, Keith Watson said "It’s comedy that makes you stop and think, and there’s not enough of it about", awarding the show four out of five stars. Ellen Jones writing in The Independent said "this comedy about comedy would be unforgivably self-indulgent if Lee wasn’t just as incisive on every other facet of modern life as he is on his own comedic genius".

Awards

In May 2010, the series was nominated for a BAFTA Television Award for Best Comedy Programme, which was won by The Armstrong & Miller Show. In May 2012, the second series of Comedy Vehicle was nominated for the same award, and won.

At the 2011 British Comedy Awards, the series won the award for Best Comedy Entertainment Programme, and Lee won Best Male Television Comic.

References

External links

The barnacle of British comedy - The Guardian, 14 March 2009. Lee interviews himself for the paper shortly before broadcast of the first show.

2009 British television series debuts
2016 British television series endings
2000s British comedy television series
2010s British comedy television series
BBC television comedy
British stand-up comedy television series
English-language television shows